Mergens is a surname. Notable people with the surname include:
Bridget Mergens, petitioner in US court case Westside Community Board of Education v. Mergens
Celeste Mergens, founder of Days for Girls

See also
Mergen